The Independent National Reawakening Bloc is an electoral list in Egypt that will compete in the 2015 Egyptian parliamentary election in the Upper Egypt district.

References

Political party alliances in Egypt
2014 establishments in Egypt
Political parties established in 2014
Electoral lists